In cricket, a player is said to have scored a century when he scores 100 or more runs in a single innings. The ICC Champions Trophy is a One Day International (ODI) tournament organised by the International Cricket Council (ICC), and is considered the second most significant after the World Cup. Originally inaugurated as the "ICC KnockOut Trophy" in 1998, the tournament is organised every four years, though it had been organised every two or three years before, and was not held in 2021. A total of 50 centuries were scored by players from 10 different teams. Players from all teams that have permanent ODI status have scored centuries. India leads the list, with ten centuries, followed by Sri Lanka, with seven.

Alistair Campbell of Zimbabwe was the first to score a century in the tournament, when he made 100 against New Zealand during the inaugural edition. Four players—Sourav Ganguly (India), Herschelle Gibbs (South Africa), Chris Gayle (West Indies) and Shikhar Dhawan (India)—hold the record for the most number of centuries, with three each. A further four players—Saeed Anwar (Pakistan), Marcus Trescothick (England), Upul Tharanga (Sri Lanka) and Shane Watson (Australia)—have each scored two centuries. Gayle's three centuries in 2006 is a record for any player in a single edition. New Zealand's Nathan Astle's 145 against the United States was the highest individual score. South Africa's Jacques Kallis's 113 not out against Sri Lanka in 1998, Ganguly's 141 not out against South Africa in 2000, and New Zealand's Chris Cairns's 102 not out against India in the same tournament feature in the top 100 ODI innings of all-time by a list released by the Wisden Cricketers' Almanack in 2002.

Six centuries were made in the finals, with three of them resulting in the centurions being on the championship winning side. The 2002 edition saw ten centuries—all at the Premadasa Stadium, Colombo, the highest for a single tournament, while the fewest centuries were scored in the 2013 edition, with three. The most recent century was made by Fakhar Zaman of Pakistan, when he scored 114 against India during the final of the 2017 edition of the tournament.

Key

Centuries

Notes

References

Bibliography

ICC Champions Trophy
Centuries
ICC Champions Trophy centuries
Centuries